Yuanyuan (Traditional Chinese: 圓圓, Simplified Chinese: 圆圆) is a Chinese name. It may refer to:

 Gao Yuanyuan (born 1979), Chinese actress
 Chen Yuanyuan (1624–1681), Chinese historical figure
 Kui Yuanyuan (born 1981), Chinese gymnast
 Yuanyuan Tan (born 1976), Chinese ballet dancer
 Xu Yuanyuan (born 1981), Chinese chess player
 Wang Yuanyuan (wrestler) (born 1977), male wrestler from China
 Wang Yuanyuan (volleyball) (born 1997), female volleyball player from China
 Zhang Yuanyuan (ambassador), Chinese ambassador to New Zealand
 The Chinese given name of figure skater Caroline Zhang (born 1993)